

Wilhelm Falley (25 September 1897 – 6 June 1944) was the first German general to be killed during the Normandy landings in France. He was commander of the 91st Infantry Division.

Career
Promoted to major general in December 1943, and lieutenant general in May 1944, he held various commands before being appointed Commander of the 91st Infantry Division in April 1944. Falley was the first German general to fall in action during the Normandy landings. On D-Day, Falley was returning from Rennes, where a war game had been organised by the German High Command, to his Division headquarters, in Picauville. Falley was killed in an ambush carried out by paratroopers of the U.S. 82nd Airborne Division, on the country road outside the rear wall of the German 91st Infantry Division's headquarters, Chateau de Bernaville, in Picauville, southwest of Sainte-Mère-Église, Normandy.

Awards and decorations

 Knight's Cross of the Iron Cross on 26 November 1941 as Oberstleutnant and commander of 4th Infantry Regiment

References

Citations

Bibliography

 D-Day 1944 - Voices from Normandy, Robert Neillands and Roderick de Normann, Cold Spring Press, New York, 2004 .
 

1897 births
1944 deaths
Military personnel from Metz
People from Alsace-Lorraine
Lieutenant generals of the German Army (Wehrmacht)
German Army personnel of World War I
Prussian Army personnel
German Army personnel killed in World War II
Recipients of the Gold German Cross
Recipients of the Knight's Cross of the Iron Cross
Recipients of the clasp to the Iron Cross, 1st class
German Army generals of World War II